The Phelloriniaceae are a family of fungi in the order Agaricales. The family contains two monotypic genera, Dictyocephalos and Phellorinia. The family was circumscribed by the German botanist Oskar Eberhard Ulbrich in 1951.

See also
List of Agaricales families

References

Agaricales families